Take (Hangul: 테이크) is a South Korean duo formed by Blue Entertainment in 2003. They debuted on April 17, 2003, with 1 Story.

Members

Current
Shin Seung-hee (신승희)
Jang Sung-jae (장성재)

Former
 Kim Do-wan (김도완)
 Lee Min-hyuk (이민혁)
 Nathan Lee (Lee Seung-hyun; 이승현)

Discography

Studio albums

Extended plays

Single albums

Singles

References

South Korean musical duos
Musical groups from Seoul
Musical groups established in 2003
2003 establishments in South Korea
CI Entertainment artists